The 1998 Privilege Insurance GT Championship was the sixth season of the British GT Championship, an auto racing series organized by the British Racing Drivers Club (BRDC) and sponsored by Privilege Insurance.  The races featured grand touring cars conforming to two categories of regulations known as GT1 and GT2, and awarded an overall driver championship from the combined categories.  The season began on 5 April 1998 and ended on 4 October 1998 after nine events, one of which was held outside Great Britain for the first time in the championship's history.

Kurt Luby and Richard Dean won the overall championship for Oftedahl Motorsport ahead of the GT1 class-leading pair of Steve O'Rourke and Tim Sugden of O'Rourke's own EMKA Racing team.

Calendar
All races were 50 minutes in duration.

Entries

GT1

GT2

Race results

References

External links
 

British GT Championship seasons
1998 in British motorsport